Dr. Henry Cottrell Rowland (March 12, 1874 – June 6, 1933) was a surgeon and writer. Several of his works were adapted into films. He was also a co-producer on films. He wrote stories for magazines and novels. Several of his works are illustrated.

Bibliography
Sea Scamps: Three Adventures of the East (1903)
The Bamboula (1904)
The Wanderers (1905)
The Mountain of Fears (1905), short stories
In the Shadow (1906)
The Countess Diane (1908)
Germaine (1910)
The Apple of Discord (1913)
The Sultana (1914) with illustrations by A. B. Wenzell
In the Service of the Princess (1910)
Of Clear Intent
The Closing Net (1912)
Filling His Own Shoes (1916)
Pearl Island (1919)
Duds (1920)
Hirondelle (1922)
Many Mansions (1932)
The Luck of Smalley
The Magnet; A Romance (1911), initially published as a serial titled "The Pilot-Fish"
Mile High; A Novel (1921)
To Windward: The Story of a Course, illustrated by Charlotte Weber

Short stories
The Forest of His Fathers (1920)
The Trees (1932)
The Merle

Filmography
Duds (1920) based on Rowland's novel Duds
The Peddler of Lies (1920) based on Rowland's The Peddler
Bonnie, Bonnie Lassie (1919), credited as one of the writers
The Sultana (1916) based on Rowland's story of the same name
Conquering the Woman (1922),  based on his short story "Kidnapping Coline"

References

External links

20th-century American male writers
1874 births
1933 deaths
American male novelists
20th-century American novelists
20th-century American short story writers
American male short story writers